Wing Wang Jian'an (8 November 1907–25 July 1980) was a Chinese military official and general in the People's Liberation Army.

Wang was born into a poor family. He enlisted in the army at the age of 17 and joined the Chinese Communist Party by age 20. He experienced many significant battles during the China's turbulent years such as the Second Sino-Japanese War and the Chinese Civil War. After the founding of the Communist State, he fought with the United States Army in Korean War. After the war he was awarded the military rank of general (Shangjiang) by Chairman Mao Zedong. And he took charge of deputy commander of Shenyang Military Region (1956–1961), and then Jinan Military Region (1961–1969) and finally Fuzhou Military District (1969–1975).

Wang was a member of the 2nd and 3rd of the National Defense Commission of the People's Republic of China. He was also a Standing Committee member of the 5th National People's Congress.

Biography

Early life
Wang was born into a family of farming background in Hong'an County, Hubei, on November 8, 1907.

He enlisted in the army of warlord Wu Peifu in 1924, while his mother died after the landlord beat her. In the winner of 1926, he returned to his hometown and that year participated in the peasant association and the Red Guards.

In August of the following year, he joined the Chinese Communist Party. Three months later, he took part in the Huangma Uprising, alongside Wang Shusheng and Wang Hongkun, they collectively known as "Three Wang". Since 1928, he fought against the Nationalists in Hubei-Henan-Anhui Area of Chinese Soviet.

Long march
In 1934, he participated in the Long March, a forced expedition over 12,500 kilometers in the 1930s.  In October 1936, he enrolled at the Counter-Japanese Military and Political University.

In May 1938, Wang was appointed as commander of Jinpu Detachment of the Eighth Route Army, he fought against the Imperial Japanese Army in north China's Shandong province.

Chinese Civil War
After the Chinese Civil War broke out in 1945, he fought with the Nationalists in Shandong, where he participated in the Battle of Southern Shandong. He was present at the Battle of Shatuji in August 1947 during the Huaihai Campaign.

PRC era
After the establishment of the Communist State in November 1949, Wang and his troops marched to Zhoushan Island but failed. In May 1950 he  ultimately seized the island.

In 1952 the Communist government commissioned him as commander and political commissar of the 9th Legion of the People's Volunteer Army. He returned to China in the Spring of 1954, while he was fainted by high blood pressure. Then he moved into a nursing home in Qingdao, a seaside city in eastern Shandong province.

He attained the rank of general (Shangjiang) on 12 January 1956. In December that year, he was appointed as deputy commander of Shenyang Military Region, five years later he was transferred to Jinan Military Region, where he stayed in August 1969, when he was transferred again to Fuzhou Military Region. In August 1975, he became a counsellor of the Central Military Commission, serving in the post until his death in July 1980.

Personal life
Wang married Niu Yuqing (1913–2007). The couple had four sons and a daughter, in order of birth: Wang Xibo, Wang Dongbo, Wang Hangbo, Wang Haibo and Wang Libo (daughter).

Awards
 Order of Bayi, 1st Class
 Order of Independence and Freedom, 1st Class
 Order of Liberation, 1st Class

References

1907 births
People from Huanggang
1980 deaths
People's Liberation Army generals from Hubei
Chinese military personnel of World War II